Lyndley Alan Craven (3 September 1945 – 11 July 2014) was a botanist who became the Principal Research Scientist of the Australian National Herbarium.

Lyndley ("Lyn") Craven worked for the CSIRO plant taxonomy unit of the New Guinea Survey Group, Division of Land Research and Regional Survey from 1964 to 1967. This was part of a unit that became the Australian National Herbarium, Centre for Australian National Biodiversity Research. Craven's duties included botanical support for land resources surveys.

Craven then left to study horticulture at Burnley Horticultural College, Victoria, earning the degree of Diploma of Horticultural Science in 1970 before being briefly employed by the Parks and Gardens Branch of Department of the Interior, Canberra. Part of this department later became the Canberra Botanic Garden and eventually the Australian National Herbarium, Centre for Australian National Biodiversity Research at the Australian National Botanic Gardens. In 1984, he earned the degree of Master of Science from Macquarie University. Craven was employed by the CSIRO at the National Herbarium from 1971, until his retirement in 2009 from the position of Principal Research Scientist.

Craven continued his association with CSIRO as a post-retirement fellow, working actively on a range of taxonomic projects.

Craven worked on the genera Melaleuca and Syzygium (family Myrtaceae) and related groups, as well as Australian representatives of the genera Hibiscus and Gossypium. He had many other interests including the herbarium library, botanical Latin, and agrihorticultural botany. Plant collecting was also a high priority.

Hibbertia cravenii, Rhododendron cravenii, Goodenia cravenii, Hibiscus cravenii, Hygrochloa cravenii, Grevillea cravenii, Xanthoparmelia cravenii, Eugenia craveniana, Syzygium cravenii, Pittosporum cravenianum, Melicope cravenii and Rhaphidophora cravenschoddeana were named in honour of Craven, the last also honouring Richard Schodde.

Published works
"Physiological, anatomical and biochemical characterisation of photosynthetic types in genus Cleome (Cleomaceae)". Functional Plant Biology. Volume 34, Number 4. 2007.
"Callistemon of New Caledonia transferred to Melaleuca (Myrtaceae)". Adansonia 20(1): 191-194. 1998. pdf
"Australian representatives of Macrostelia transferred to Hibiscus (Malvaceae), with the description of a new species".

 pdf
 pdf

Species for which Craven is a taxon authority

See also :Category:Taxa named by Lyndley Craven

Species assessed
Lithops hermetica

References

20th-century Australian botanists
1945 births
2014 deaths
Botanists active in Australia
21st-century Australian botanists